Fassnacht or Faßnacht is a German surname. Notable people with the surname include:

Hans Fassnacht (born 1950), German swimmer
Robert Fassnacht (1937–1970), American physicist
Rudi Faßnacht (1934–2000), German football manager

German-language surnames